The Ca' d'Oro or Palazzo Santa Sofia is a palace on the Grand Canal in Venice, northern Italy. One of the older palaces in the city, its name means "golden house" due to the gilt and polychrome external decorations which once adorned its walls. Since 1927, it has been used as a museum, as the Galleria Giorgio Franchetti.

It has long been regarded as the best surviving palazzo in Venetian Gothic architecture, retaining all the most characteristic features, despite some losses. On the facade, the loggia-like window group of closely spaced small columns, with heavy tracery with quatrefoil openings above, uses the formula from the Doge's Palace that had become iconic.  There are also the  byzantine-inspired decoration along the roofline, and patterning in fancy coloured stone to the flat wall surfaces.  The smaller windows show a variety of forms with an ogee arch, capped with a relief ornament, and the edges and zone boundaries are marked with ropework reliefs.

The third act of Amilcare Ponchielli's opera La gioconda is set in the palace.

History

The palace was built between 1428 and 1430 for the Contarini family, who provided Venice with eight Doges between 1043 and 1676. The architects of the Ca d'Oro were Giovanni Bon and his son Bartolomeo Bon.

Following the fall of the Venetian Republic in 1797, the palace changed ownership several times. In 1846, Alessandro Trubetzkoi, purchased the palace, which was in a ruinous state, as a gift for ballet dancer Marie Taglioni. The reckless renovation of the architect resulted in his imprisonment under charges of vandalism. In the end, many of the Gothic features, including the stairway of the inner courtyard and the balconies which overlooked the courtyard, were removed. 

In 1894, the palace was acquired by its last owner, baron Giorgio Franchetti; throughout his lifetime, he amassed an important art collection and personally oversaw its extensive restoration, including the reconstruction of the stairway and the Cosmatesque courtyard with ancient marbles.  In 1916, Franchetti bequeathed the Ca' d'Oro to the Italian State.  It is now open to the public as a gallery: Galleria Giorgio Franchetti alla Ca' d'Oro.

During the 2019 Venice flood, waters reached the top of the wellhead in the inner courtyard.

Description
The principal façade of Ca' d'Oro facing onto the Grand Canal is built in the Bons' floral Venetian Gothic style. Other nearby buildings in this style are Palazzo Barbaro and the Palazzo Giustinian. This linear style favoured by the Venetian architects was not superseded by Venetian Renaissance architecture until the end of the 15th century, or later.

On the ground floor, a recessed colonnaded loggia gives access to the entrance hall (portego de mezo) directly from the canal. Above this colonnade is the enclosed balcony of the principal salon on the piano nobile. The columns and arches of this balcony have capitals which in turn support a row of quatrefoil windows; above this balcony is another enclosed balcony or loggia of a similar yet lighter design.

The palace has (like other similar buildings in Venice) a small inner courtyard. The neighboring palace is Palazzo Giustinian Pesaro.

Francis H. Kimball, the famed American architect behind landmarks like the Empire State Building, used the Ca' d'Oro as inspiration for the Montauk Club, a social club in Brooklyn, New York.

Museum 

The gallery houses the collection of works of art collected by Giorgio Franchetti in his life. Following the donation to the Italian State in 1916 and in preparation for the museum, the Franchetti collection was accompanied by some state collections from which most of the bronzes and sculptures on display come from, as well as numerous Venetian and Flemish paintings.

Among the most valuable works are the San Sebastiano by Andrea Mantegna and the Portrait of Marcello Durazzo by Antoon van Dyck.

In addition to the exhibition rooms, the museum houses various laboratories for the conservation and restoration of works of art.

See also 
 List of buildings and structures in Venice

References

External links 

Galleria Giorgio Franchetti
Satellite image from Google Maps
Ca' d'Oro on Smarthistory

Buildings and structures completed in 1430
Art museums and galleries in Venice
Historic house museums in Italy
House of Contarini
Museums in Venice
D'Oro
D'Oro
Gothic architecture in Venice
National museums of Italy
1827 establishments in Italy